Fat Ham is a play by James Ijames. It is an adaptation of William Shakespeare's Hamlet that was the winner of the 2022 Pulitzer Prize for Drama.

Summary
Juicy, a young queer Black man, is confronted by the ghost of his father during a barbecue, who demands that Juicy avenge his murder. Juicy, already familiar with Hamlet's plight, tries to break the cycles of trauma and violence.

Production
The play premiered in 2021 in a filmed production for the Wilma Theatre in Philadelphia. It made its Off-Broadway debut at The Public Theater on May 12, 2022. The Public Theater production will transfer to Broadway in 2023 with the entire cast and most of the creative team intact. Previews will begin at the American Airlines Theatre on March 21, with opening night on April 12. The production is scheduled to have a strictly limited run to August 6.

References

External links
 New York Times review

Pulitzer Prize for Drama-winning works
African-American plays
2022 plays
Plays and musicals based on Hamlet